Piovene Rocchette is a town in the province of Vicenza, Veneto,  northern Italy. It is west of SP349 provincial road.

Monte Summano dominates Piovene Rocchette and has been place of religious pilgrimage since the 15th century. On the slopes of Mount Summano is the 17th century chapel of Ospizio which once hosted pilgrims making the trip to Monte Summano. Near the summit of the mountain is the pilgrimage church of Santa Maria del Summano.

Sources

(Google Maps)

Cities and towns in Veneto